The Spanish National Time Trial Championship is a time trial race that takes place inside the Spanish National Cycling Championship, and decides the best cyclist in this type of race. The time trial championships in Spain have not been held for as long as the Spanish National Road Race Championships, which first took place in 1897. The first race winner of the time trial championship was Abraham Olano in 1994. Jonathan Castroviejo holds the record for the most wins in the men's championship with five titles, followed by Iván Gutiérrez and Luis León Sánchez, with both riders winning four titles. The women's record is held by Teodora Ruano with 7 wins. The current champions are Raúl García Pierna and Margarita Victoria García.

Multiple winners

Men

Women

Men

Elite

U23

Women

Elite

See also
Spanish National Road Race Championships
National road cycling championships

References

External links
Past winners (men) on cyclebase.nl
Past winners (women) on cyclebase.nl

National road cycling championships
Cycle races in Spain
Recurring sporting events established in 1994
1994 establishments in Spain
Time Trial